Hillel Solotaroff (1865–1921) was a doctor known for his leadership in the New York Jewish/Yiddish anarchist movement. Solotaroff emigrated from Elizabetgrad in 1882 and while he pursued medical school, wrote for anarchist publications and was an exceptionally popular speaker. He became a member of the Jewish anarchist group Pioneers of Liberty and introduced the anarchist duo Emma Goldman and Alexander Berkman. Solotaroff continued writing through his life for various publications, writing a daily column for yiddish-language daily newspaper Der Tog (The Day). Later in his life, Solotaroff's views moved towards nationalism and Socialist Zionism.

References

Further reading 

 

1865 births
1921 deaths
Politicians from Kropyvnytskyi
People from Kherson Governorate
American anarchists
American people of Russian-Jewish descent
American Zionists
Labor Zionists
Russian anarchists
Jewish anarchists
American physicians
Anarchism in New York (state)
Emma Goldman
Editors of Fraye Arbeter Shtime
Yiddish-language writers